Volchkov, feminine: Volchkova is a Russian surname. The origin comes from "волк", wolf. A transliteration variant is Voltchkov.

Notable people with the surname include:

Alexander Volchkov (jurist) (1902–1978), Russian judge
Alexander Volchkov (ice hockey, born 1952), Soviet ice hockey player
Alexander Volchkov (ice hockey, born 1977), Russian ice hockey player
Olga Volchkova (born 1970), Russian-born American painter
Sergei Volchkov (Russian Academy of Sciences) (1707—1773) Russian printer and translator
Sergei Volchkov (singer), winner of The Voice
Viktoria Volchkova (born 1982), Russian figure skater and coach
Vladimir Voltchkov (born 1978), Belarusian tennis player

References

Russian-language surnames